Karol Bagh Lok Sabha constituency was a Lok Sabha (parliamentary) constituency in the Indian National Capital Territory of Delhi. This constituency came into existence in 1961. It was abolished after the recommendations of the Delimitation Commission were approved by the presidential notification on 19 February 2008. This constituency was reserved for the candidates belonging to the scheduled castes.

Assembly segments
From 1966 to 1993, Karol Bagh Lok Sabha constituency comprised the following Delhi Metropolitan Council segments:
 Rajinder Nagar
 Ramnagar
 Sarai Rohilla
 Motia Khan
 Dev Nagar
 Patel Nagar
 Anand Parbat
 Shadipur

From 1993 to 2008, it comprised the following Delhi Vidhan Sabha segments:
 Patel Nagar 
 Rajinder Nagar 
 Karol Bagh 
 Ram Nagar (Polling stations 1-103)
 Baljit Nagar  
 Moti Nagar (Polling stations 107, 108 and 109)

Members of Parliament

See also
 Karol Bagh
 West Delhi (Lok Sabha constituency)
 List of former constituencies of the Lok Sabha

References

1961 establishments in Delhi
Constituencies established in 1961
Former Lok Sabha constituencies of Delhi
Former constituencies of the Lok Sabha
2008 disestablishments in India
Constituencies disestablished in 2008